Möngöl Hörde is the self-titled debut album by British hardcore punk band Möngöl Hörde, released in 2014 through Xtra Mile Recordings.

Track listing

Music videos
"Casual Threats From Weekend Hardmen" ,
"How The Communists Ruined Christmas"
"Tapeworm Uprising".

Personnel
Adapted from the Möngöl Hörde liner notes.

Möngöl Hörde
 Frank Turner – vocals
 Matt Nasir - guitar
 Ben Dawson - drums

Production
 Derya Nagle – production, mixing
 Peter Miles – engineering
 Jay Malhondra – engineering
 Denis Blackham – mastering

Additional personnel
 Joaquin Ardiles – artwork
 Ben Morse – photography

Charts

References

2014 albums
Möngöl Hörde albums